William Gulliland (3 February 1871 – 13 March 1928) was a Scottish footballer, who played for Queen's Park and represented Scotland four times.

References

Sources

1871 births
1928 deaths
Association football wingers
Scottish footballers
Scotland international footballers
Queen's Park F.C. players
Footballers from Glasgow